Irmaklı  (literally "with river") is a village in Mut district of  Mersin Province, Turkey. At  its situated at the west bank of  Göksu River. The population of Irmaklı was 213  as of 2012. Main economic activity is agriculture and animal husbandry. Main crops are various fruits.

References

Villages in Mut District